Louis-Gabriel Pambo is a Gabonese politician. As of 2009, he is the National Secretary of the Environment, Forestry, Fisheries, Tourism and Sustainable Development for the ruling Gabonese Democratic Party (Parti démocratique gabonais, PDG).

References

Gabonese Democratic Party politicians
Living people
Year of birth missing (living people)
Government ministers of Gabon
21st-century Gabonese people